William Poeschel House, also known as the Poeschel-Harrison House, is a historic home located near Hermann, Gasconade County, Missouri. It was built about 1869, and is a two-story, ell-shaped, red brick dwelling.  It features a two-story, gable-roofed portico, and a two-story porch that spans the east side of the rear ell.

It was listed on the National Register of Historic Places in 1990.

References

Houses on the National Register of Historic Places in Missouri
Houses completed in 1869
Buildings and structures in Gasconade County, Missouri
National Register of Historic Places in Gasconade County, Missouri